Hermann Vöchting (8 February 1847, Blomberg – 24 November 1917, Tübingen) was a German botanist.

He studied botany in Berlin, where he was influenced by Alexander Braun (1805–1877), Leopold Kny (1841–1916), and Nathaniel Pringsheim (1823–1894), earning his doctorate in 1873 at the University of  Göttingen with a thesis on Rhipsalideae. From 1874 he worked as a lecturer at the University of Bonn, distinguishing himself with experimental studies involving plant morphology.

In 1878 he succeeded Wilhelm Pfeffer (1845–1920) as chair of botany at the University of Basel, later relocating to the University of Tübingen, where he again was Pfeffer's successor (1887). At Tübingen he was also appointed director of the botanical institute. 

Vöchting is remembered for his pioneer investigations in the field of plant physiology, including important studies involving plant root/shoot polarity.

Today the "Hermann-Vöchting-Gymnasium" in Blomberg is named in his honour.

Written works 
 Über organbildung im Pflanzenreich, physiologische untersuchungen, 1878 - On organ formation in the plant kingdom, physiological studies.
 Die Bewegungen der Blüthen und Früchte, 1882 - On movement of blossoms and fruits.
 Über Transplantation am Pflanzenkörper, 1892 - On transplantation of the "plant body".
 Untersuchungen zur experimentellen Anatomie und Pathologie des Pflanzenkörpers 1908 - Experimental studies on the anatomy and pathology of the "plant body".

References 
 Botanical abstracts, Volumes 9-10 by Board of Control of Botanical Abstracts (biography)

1847 births
1917 deaths
People from Blomberg, North Rhine-Westphalia
People from the Principality of Lippe
19th-century German botanists
Academic staff of the University of Basel
Academic staff of the University of Tübingen